At least three teams in minor league baseball have borne the name Indianapolis Hoosiers.

Western League Hoosiers I
The first Western League, which lasted only part of the  season, included an Indianapolis Hoosiers team.  This Hoosiers team won the 1885 Western League pennant.

Western League Hoosiers II

Western Association Hoosiers
One of the two Western Associations that existed in  also had a team known as the Indianapolis Hoosiers. Both the team and league lasted only one season.

References

Defunct minor league baseball teams
Sports teams in Indianapolis
Professional baseball teams in Indiana
1885 establishments in Indiana
1901 disestablishments in Indiana
Baseball teams established in 1885
Baseball teams disestablished in 1901
Defunct baseball teams in Indiana
Defunct Western Association teams